

List of Ambassadors

Alon Shoham 2017 - 
Yossef Shagal 2012 - 2015
Edward Shapira 2009 - 2011
Zeev Ben-Arie 2004 - 2009
Martin Peled-Flax 1998 - 2002
Zeev Ben-Arie 1997 chargé d'affaires

References

Belarus
Israel